The Ukrainian Amateur Cup or AAFU Cup is a national cup competition in Ukraine for amateur clubs. The nationwide competition among amateur teams in cup format (Olympic system) was revived in the 1996–97 season and since 2008 the winner receives the right to progress to the Ukrainian Cup which serves professional clubs.

Format 
The Cup is intended to be organised between the Cup holders of the regional tournaments, but in reality it is an optional invitational tournament among teams that are delegated by selected regions (oblasts of Ukraine and autonomous republic of Crimea). Regions are not obligated to present their teams or fill their competition berths, there is no limitation on amount of teams from each region. All teams are applying for the competition once the AAFU provides its "registration window" and, if approved by the AAFU, then compete for the competition's trophy.

Traditionally, every play-off (match up) round consists of two legs including the final. The winner of the competition qualifies for the Ukrainian Cup. Most of seasons consist of at least four rounds usually starting with the Round of 16.

Origins of the competition 
Originally the competitions were established back in 1959 among teams of so-called "team of physical culture" (KFK) which was a special term in the Soviet football for teams that were not teams of masters. The first winner became Shakhtar Korostyshiv from Zhytomyr Oblast. The competitions were conducted until 1989 and their winner was awarded a prize from an editor's office of "Radianska Ukraina" newspaper. In 1990 there was reform in the Soviet football and competitions were discontinued being replaced by competitions among teams of masters from Soviet lower leagues.

The first series of the competition was organised by the Ukrainian Football Federation for 1996–97. The first Ukrainian Amateur Cup final was played in the spring of 1997 with Domobud Chernihiv defeating Krystal Parkhomivka 3–1 on aggregate  (results for the two games 1–1 and 2–0).

From the 1997–98 season the competition has been managed by the Ukrainian Football Amateur Association acting on behalf of the Ukrainian Football Federation. An autumn-spring competition period was used until 1998–99 and since then a spring-autumn system has been adopted over the calendar year.

Finals 
The club in bold is the winner.

Stadiums
List of stadiums with the biggest number of hosted finals
3 – Yednist Stadium, Plysky, Chernihiv Oblast
2 – Avanhard Stadium, Lutsk
2 – Kolos Stadium, Parkhomivka, Kharkiv Oblast
2 – Metalurh Stadium, Yenakieve, Donetsk Oblast
2 – Nad Buhom Stadium, Kamianka-Buzka, Lviv Oblast
2 – Yuvileinyi Stadium, Bucha, Kyiv Oblast
2 – Kozak Arena, Petropavlivska-Borshchahivka, Kyiv Oblast
2 – Kuziv Stadium, Demnia, Lviv Oblast
2 – Viktoriya Stadium, Mykolaivka, Sumy Oblast
2 – LNZ Arena, Lebedyn, Cherkasy Oblast

Cup for amateur clubs (Ukrainian SSR)
Ukrainian Cup (prize of the "Radyanska Ukrayina" newspaper)

List of finalists by regions

Regions and teams

1997–2020

2020–present

Participated teams by regions

See also 
 Ukrainian football championship among amateurs
 Soviet Amateur Cup
 Football Cup of the Ukrainian SSR

References

External links 
  Ukrainian Football Amateur Association
  Ukrainian Football Federation

External links
 Ukrainian Cup among amateurs (Кубок Украины среди любителей). Footballfacts.ru

 
Amateur
Recurring sporting events established in 1959
1959 establishments in Ukraine
Amateur association football
Amateur sport in Ukraine